The 1941 Toledo Rockets football team was an American football team that represented Toledo University in the Ohio Athletic Conference (OAC) during the 1941 college football season. In their sixth season under head coach Clarence Spears, the Rockets compiled a 7–4 record.

The team's backfield included two African-Americans, right halfback Robert Nash and left halfback Dick Huston.

Schedule

References

Toledo
Toledo Rockets football seasons
Toledo Rockets football